A Beutelwurst is a German blood sausage (Rotwurst or Blutwurst), which contains more pieces of fat and flour than a normal Thüringer Rotwurst.

The name Beutelwurst comes from the fact that this does not come in a casing of intestine or a can, but in a linen or paper bag ("bag" = Beutel).
This bag is pressed for several weeks which gives the Beutelwurst a firm, light, dry consistency.

References 

German sausages
Blood sausages